Aklad is a small village situated beside  the Panzra river  where  most people speak Aahirani. The village is in the state of Maharashtra, India. It is located in the Dhule taluka of Dhule District in Maharashtra. Day after shivratri there was a fare of lord Mahajanba. People ware enthusiastic to celebrate the fare  next day of fare bouts of wrestling organised. It is small but smart village .as  main profession of the village is farming.

See also 
 Dhule District
 List of villages in Dhule District
 List of districts of Maharashtra
 Maharashtra

References 
 1. Census Of India: 2001: Population for Village Code 157400
 2. Government of India: Ministry of Panchayati Raj

Villages in Dhule taluka
Villages in Dhule district